King in the North or King of the North is a fictional title that is used in the HBO television series Game of Thrones, given to the King of the sovereign northern kingdom in Westeros. It is distinct from the similar title Warden of the North, held by the vassal of the Lord of the Seven Kingdoms.

Other uses
Antoine Labelle (1833–1891), a Roman Catholic priest involved in the settlement of the Laurentians, Quebec, Canada
Domnall mac Áeda Muindeirg (died 804), chief of the Cenél Conaill of the northern Uí Néill in modern County Donegal, Ireland
King of the North (album), 2017 EP by UK rapper Bugzy Malone
Nickname for NFL quarterback Aaron Rodgers
"King in the North", an episode of the American television show Fresh Off the Boat
 A nickname for basketball player Kawhi Leonard